Lannevesi is a medium-sized lake of Central Finland in the Kymijoki main catchment area. It is situated in Saarijärvi municipality. Lannevesi flows its water to the north, Summasjärvi by Lannejoki River. 

Near the lake there is Lannevesi village.

See also
List of lakes in Finland

References

Lakes of Saarijärvi
Lakes of Uurainen